Upsy Daisy Assortment is a U.S.-exclusive compilation by XTC, released after Geffen Records declined to distribute the 1996 double-disc Fossil Fuel: The XTC Singles 1977-1992.

It is perhaps their first compilation to be considered a Best of as it includes album tracks "Funk Pop a Roll", "Seagulls Screaming Kiss Her, Kiss Her", "Earn Enough for Us" and "Chalkhills and Children" in addition to their better-known singles.

The cover art is a reproduction of a vintage 1945 travel poster called "Holidays in Switzerland" by Donald Brun.

Track listing
All songs written by Andy Partridge, except where noted.
"Life Begins at the Hop" (Colin Moulding) – 3:47
"Making Plans for Nigel" (Moulding) – 4:12
"Generals and Majors" (Moulding) – 3:41
"Respectable Street" – 3:07
"Senses Working Overtime" – 4:34
"Ball and Chain" (Moulding) – 4:29
"No Thugs in Our House" – 5:10
"Love on a Farmboy's Wages" – 3:59
"Funk Pop a Roll" – 3:14
"This World Over" – 4:45
"Seagulls Screaming Kiss Her Kiss Her" – 3:50
"Grass" (Moulding) – 2:42
"Dear God" – 3:37
"Earn Enough for Us" – 2:54
"Mayor of Simpleton" – 3:57
"King for a Day" (Moulding) – 3:36
"Chalkhills and Children" – 4:56
"The Disappointed" – 3:38
"The Ballad of Peter Pumpkinhead" – 5:03

References

XTC compilation albums
1997 compilation albums
Geffen Records compilation albums